Claire or Clare Taylor may refer to:

 Claire Taylor (born 1975), English cricketer
 Claire Taylor (tennis) (born 1975), English tennis player
 Clare Taylor (born 1965), English cricketer and footballer
 Claire Taylor, character in All for a Girl (1912 film)
 Claire Drainie Taylor (1917 - 2009), Canadian actor
 Clare Eichner-Taylor (born 1969), US long-distance runner